The 1996 Oceanian Futsal Championship (OFC) was the second edition of the main international futsal tournament of the Oceanian region. It took place from August 3 to August 8, 1996, and was hosted by Port Vila, Vanuatu.

The tournament also acted as a qualifying tournament for the 1996 FIFA Futsal World Championship in Spain. The Australia won the tournament, and qualified for the World Cup.

Group stage

Group

All time at UTC+11

Champion

References

External links
 Oceanian Futsal Championship su RSSSF.com

1996
1996 in futsal
Futsal
1996 in Vanuatuan sport
International futsal competitions hosted by Vanuatu